Ralph Gunesch (born 2 September 1983) is a German former professional footballer who played as a centre-back.

Career
Gunesch moved to Germany when he was very young. From 2001 to 2003 he played for Alemannia Aachen. In 2003, he was transferred to FC St. Pauli. During the summer of 2006 he moved to Bundesliga side 1. FSV Mainz 05, where he made his first league debut. In June 2007 he transferred back to FC St. Pauli.

Having joined FC Ingolstadt 04 in winter 2012 he left the club at the end of the 2014–15 season. He made 50 league appearances during his spell there.

Personal life 

Gunesch is of German heritage (more specifically Transylvanian Saxon), and one quarter Romanian through his maternal grandfather.

Honours
FC Ingolstadt
2. Bundesliga: 2014–15

References

External links

 
 Profile at DFB.de

1983 births
Living people
German footballers
1. FSV Mainz 05 players
Alemannia Aachen players
FC St. Pauli players
Bundesliga players
2. Bundesliga players
Association football central defenders
Romanian expatriate footballers
Romanian footballers
German people of German-Romanian descent
Transylvanian Saxon people
People from Sighișoara
FC Ingolstadt 04 II players